Pacific Southwest Airlines Flight 1771 was a scheduled flight along the West Coast of the United States, from Los Angeles, California, to San Francisco. On December 7, 1987, the British Aerospace 146-200A, registration N350PS, crashed in San Luis Obispo County near Cayucos, after being hijacked by a passenger.

All 43 passengers and crew aboard the plane died, five of whom, including the two pilots, were presumably shot dead before the plane crashed. The perpetrator, David Burke, was a disgruntled former employee of USAir, the parent company of Pacific Southwest Airlines. The crash was the second-worst mass murder in Californian history, after the similar crash of Pacific Air Lines Flight 773 in 1964.

Incident 

USAir, which had recently purchased Pacific Southwest Airlines (PSA), terminated David A. Burke, a ticketing agent, for petty theft of $69 from in-flight cocktail receipts; he had also been suspected of involvement with a narcotics ring. After meeting with Ray Thomson, his manager, in an unsuccessful attempt to be reinstated, Burke purchased a ticket on PSA Flight 1771, a daily flight from Los Angeles International Airport (LAX) to San Francisco International Airport (SFO). Thomson was a passenger on the flight, which he regularly took for his daily commute from his workplace at LAX to his home in the San Francisco Bay Area. Flight 1771 departed from LAX at 15:31 PST, scheduled to arrive in San Francisco at 16:43.

Using USAir employee credentials that he had not yet surrendered, Burke, armed with a Smith & Wesson Model 29 .44 Magnum revolver that he had borrowed from a coworker, was able to bypass the normal passenger security checkpoint at LAX. He gained access to the plane via the locked crew door using the access code scratched above the lock as reported by one of the lawyers representing families of two dead passengers.  After boarding the plane, Burke wrote a message on an airsickness bag, but whether or not he gave the message to Thomson to read before shooting him is unknown. The note read:

Hi Ray. I think it's sort of ironical that we end up like this. I asked for some leniency for my family. Remember? Well, I got none and you'll get none."Note of doom found in PSA jet wreckage; message apparently written by fired USAir employee supports FBI's theory of vengeance," Los Angeles Times, December 11, 1987

The exact sequence of events remains undetermined, though some details were able to be determined based on information from the aircraft's cockpit voice recorder (CVR). Due to the poor quality of the recording, it was not possible to decipher everything spoken in the cockpit, nor was it possible to positively attribute phrases to specific individuals. During the controller's reply, the CVR picked up two "high-level gunshot-like sound[s]." Burke had likely shot Thomson at this time. One of the pilots reported twice to the center controller that there had been gunshots fired aboard the aircraft. As the controller asked the pilots whether they wished to divert to Monterey, the sound of the cockpit door opening could be heard, followed by the sound of a female voice, believed to be Flight Attendant Debbie Neal. What was said by her could not be discerned, aside from the word "captain." This was followed one second later by a male voice saying something that was mostly unintelligible on the recording but ended with the word "problem." The FBI's transcript notes that this may have been Burke's voice. Although it is popularly believed that the complete phrase spoken by Burke had been "I'm the problem," this does not appear in the official FBI report. Immediately following this exchange, two more gunshot sounds were registered, followed by another gunshot six seconds later.

Most likely, Burke shot Lindamood and Nunn, incapacitating them, if not outright killing them. Fifteen seconds later, the CVR picked up the sound of the cockpit door either opening or closing, as well as increasing windscreen noise as the airplane pitched down and accelerated. Thirty-two seconds after the sounds made by the cockpit door, a sixth and final gunshot was heard. All that could be determined was that this shot occurred in the passenger cabin. Some speculation arose that Burke shot himself, though this seems unlikely because a fragment of Burke's fingertip was lodged in the trigger when the investigators found the revolver. This indicated that he was alive and was holding the gun until the moment of impact. The most probable victim was an off-duty pilot that was working for PSA, Douglas Arthur, who was likely trying to enter the cockpit in an attempt to get the plane out of the dive. For the remainder of the recording, the sound of windscreen noise and "distant voices" could be heard.

At 4:16 pm, the plane crashed into a hillside on the Santa Rita cattle ranch in the Santa Lucia Mountains between Paso Robles and Cayucos. Based on the deformation of the titanium black box data recorder case, the aircraft experienced a deceleration of  when it hit the ground. It was traveling around a 70° angle toward the south. Only 11 of the passengers were ever identified.

After the crash site was located by a CBS News helicopter piloted by Zoey Tur, investigators from the National Transportation Safety Board  were joined by the Federal Bureau of Investigation. After two days of digging through what was left of the plane, they found the parts of a handgun containing six spent cartridge cases and the note on the airsickness bag written by Burke, indicating that he may have been responsible for the crash. FBI investigators were able to lift a print from a fragment of finger stuck in the revolver's trigger guard, which positively identified Burke as holding the weapon when the aircraft crashed. In addition to the evidence uncovered at the crash site, other factors surfaced. Burke's coworker admitted to having lent him the gun, and Burke had also left a farewell message on his girlfriend's answering machine.

David A. Burke 

David Augustus Burke (18 May 1952 – 7 December 1987) was born in Croydon, England, to Jamaican parents. Burke later emigrated to the United States with his parents. He had previously worked for USAir in Rochester, New York, where he was a suspect in a drug-smuggling ring that was bringing cocaine from Jamaica to Rochester via the airline. Never officially charged, he reportedly relocated to Los Angeles to avoid future suspicions. Some former girlfriends, neighbors, and law enforcement officials described him as a violent man before the events of Flight 1771. He had seven children from four women, but never married.

Aftermath 
Several federal laws were passed after the crash, including a law that required "immediate seizure of all airline and airport employee credentials" after an employee's termination, resignation or retirement from an airline or airport position. A policy was also implemented stipulating that all airline flight crew and airport employees were to be subject to the same security measures as airline passengers.

The crash killed the president of Chevron USA, James Sylla, along with three of the company's public-affairs executives. Also killed were three officials of Pacific Bell, prompting many large corporations to create policies to forbid travel by multiple executives on the same flight.

In the "Garden of Hope" section of the Los Osos Valley Memorial Park,  a granite and bronze marker honors the 42 victims of Flight 1771, and a number of the passengers and crew are buried in that cemetery.

Dramatization 

An episode of the Canadian documentary TV series Mayday titled "I'm the Problem" ("Murder on Board" for UK broadcasts) chronicled the events of Flight 1771 and its ensuing investigation.

Flight 1771 was also dramatised in Aircrash Confidential.

See also 
 Aviation safety
 Pacific Air Lines Flight 773 was a similar mass-murder–suicide in 1964.
 Federal Express Flight 705 was a failed hijacking murder–suicide in 1994.
 Samuel Byck attempted to hijack an airliner to fly into the White House in 1974.
 List of accidents and incidents involving commercial aircraft
 List of aviation incidents involving terrorism
 List of Mayday episodes
 List of homicides in California

References

External links 


 Official NTSB Summary
PSA Flight 182 & 1771 Memorial Page at The PSA History Museum (Archive)
 Aviation Safety Network criminal occurrence description

Airliner accidents and incidents involving deliberate crashes
1987 in California
1987 murders in the United States
Accidents and incidents involving the British Aerospace 146
Aircraft hijackings in the United States
Airliner accidents and incidents caused by hijacking
Airliner accidents and incidents in California
Aviation accidents and incidents in the United States in 1987
Attacks in the United States in 1987
Crimes in California
Disasters in California
Deaths by firearm in California
History of San Luis Obispo County, California
Mass murder in 1987
Mass murder in California
Mass shootings in California
Mass shootings in the United States
1987 mass shootings in the United States
Murder–suicides in the United States
1771
December 1987 events in the United States
Mass murder in the United States